Glen Burnie, near Hopkinsville, Kentucky, dates from around 1830.  It was listed on the National Register of Historic Places in 1979.

It is a two-story, five-bay Federal-style brick house, with brick laid in Flemish bond.  It has a central passage plan, a molded brick cornice and a Greek Revival-style porch which is believed to be original.  It was originally L-shaped and a one-story extension was added later.

References

National Register of Historic Places in Christian County, Kentucky
Federal architecture in Kentucky
Greek Revival architecture in Kentucky
Houses completed in 1830
1830 establishments in Kentucky
Houses on the National Register of Historic Places in Kentucky
Houses in Christian County, Kentucky
Central-passage houses